Mir Hashim Ali Khan (honorific titles: Nawab Hashim Nawaz Jang Bahadur, Colonel, Sardar Bahadur) was commandant of the 2nd Lancers, Hyderabad Imperial Service Troops.

Biography
Mir Hashim Ali Khan represented the Hyderabad Imperial Lancers at Queen Victoria's Diamond Jubilee. On reaching Hyderabad-deccan with the help of other Commandants, he founded the 2nd Nizams own (N.O.) Hyderabad Imperial Service (H.I.S.) Lancers Troops. The Regiment was first raised in 1893 at Golkonda (HYD-Deccan) by the late general Sir Afsar-ul-mulk Bahadur, the then commander of the Nizams regular forces.

The regiment was designated as 2nd lancers Hyderabad Imperial Service Troops and was organised in accordance with the establishment of the Indian Cav. Regt. In April 1923, the regiment was again re-organised and re-designated by Col. Hashim Nawaz Jung. O.B.I. Col. Sardar Bahadur, as 2nd Hyderabad Imperial Service Lancers (Nizams own) and soon made its Commandant after getting retired from the 2nd lancers. He served as commanding officer of the Nizam Mahbub Force. The Hyderabad Imperial Services Troops wasn't an IST unit, but a part of the Indian army. Navy & Army Illustrated published an article about the unit, featuring Mir Hashim Ali Khan.

Family

Mir Hashim Ali Khan was married to Zakia Begum. The couple had four sons and eight daughters. The sons included Nawab Alam yar jung Bahadur, Chief Justice of Hyderabad and Law Minister, Nawab Talib Ali Khan, Accountant General of Hyderabad, Subhan Ali Khan, & Iqbal ali khan. The daughters included Mehdi Begum w/o Dr Syed Mehdi Ali (Mansabdar), Tahera Begum, Syeda Begum, Masooma Begum, Shujaath Begum, Abbasi Begum, Khairunissa Begum, and Taiba Begum.

Honors and titles

Mir Hashim Ali Khan received the following honours and distinctions from the British Government and the Nizam of Hyderabad.
 Nawab
 Nawaz Jung
 Bahadur
 Order of British India (O.B.I.)
 Colonel
 Sardar Bahadur (heroic leader)
 Commandant
 Mansabdar
 Jagirdar

Gallery

References

Indian Muslims
Military personnel from Hyderabad, India
British Indian Army officers